Buckinghamshire Fire and Rescue Service (also known as Buckinghamshire and Milton Keynes Fire and Rescue Service), is the Local Authority Fire Service serving the English unitary authorities of Buckinghamshire and the City of Milton Keynes.

The Combined Fire Authority became operational on 1 April 1997 as a result of the Buckinghamshire Fire Services (Combination Scheme) Order 1996, which was approved in November 1996.

Performance
In 2018/2019, every fire and rescue service in England and Wales was subjected to a statutory inspection by His Majesty's Inspectorate of Constabulary and Fire & Rescue Services (HIMCFRS). Another cycle of inspections was carried out starting in 2021.The inspections investigate how well the service performs in each of three areas. On a scale of outstanding, good, requires improvement and inadequate, Buckinghamshire Fire and Rescue Service was rated as follows:

Fire stations and appliances 

Buckinghamshire Fire and Rescue Service operates 19 fire stations, 
of which two are crewed day and night by wholetime firefighters, ten are crewed by on-call firefighters who live near to their fire station and can arrive there within ten minutes of a call being received, and seven are crewed by a combination of wholetime and on-call firefighters.
Buckinghamshire Fire and Rescue Service also operate a pool of "flexi-firefighters" who fill in gaps in wholetime crewing.

Blue Light Hub 
On 10 February 2016, Buckinghamshire and Milton Keynes Fire Authority (BMKFA) approved plans for a new combined station to be used alongside Thames Valley Police, South Central Ambulance Service, and NHS Blood and Transplant, named the "Blue Light Hub" to be built. The new station is intended to house over 200 fire, police, and ambulance staff who will be relocating from various locations across Milton Keynes to work together in one central location.

On 30 June 2020, fire crews from Great Holm and Bletchley fire stations moved into the new West Ashland fire station, inside the Blue Light Hub.

See also 

List of British firefighters killed in the line of duty

References

External links

 
Buckinghamshire Fire and Rescue Service at HMICFRS

Fire and rescue services of England
Fire and Rescue Service